Muston Park is an urban park of 2.0186 hectares, situated in the suburb of Chatswood, seven kilometres north of Sydney, Australia.

History 

The local indigenous Australian people, the Cammeraygal occupied this area for at least 5,800 years. The park is named after William Thomas Muston, the original European owner of the land and Mayor of Willoughby in 1890. His house ‘Penshurst’ stood in the middle of the area and was sold in 1921. By 1938 cows were still grazing in the park. Circuses performed here, such as Sole Brother's Circus in 1939 and Wirth's Circus in 1942. In the second world war, parts of the park were used by the military. 

In 1952, plantations of gum trees were created, named King George VI Memorial Grove in the north made of Spotted Gums, and Queen Elizabeth II Grove in the south near the children's playground composed of the similar looking Lemon scented gums. At the same time, the Wisteria walkway was created.

Geography 

Soils are moderately fertile, based on a transitional zone between the Hawkesbury sandstone and Ashfield Shale. Originally the area would have supported Blue Gum High Forest, but no original trees remain.

The oldest trees in the park probably date from the 1880s, when Muston Park was part of a pleasure ground known as Royal Park. They include a Camphor Laurel, Bunya Pine, Hoop Pine, White Booyong, Moreton Bay Fig and an Oak.

Wildlife 
Pacific Black Ducks, Sulfur-crested cockatoos, Water dragons and brush turkeys are some of the creatures seen in the park.

See also
 Parks in Sydney

References

Parks in Sydney
Chatswood, New South Wales